GoodGuide.Com was an online web, iPhone app and Android app tool which enabled consumers to retrieve evaluations of the health, environmental, and social impacts of consumer products such as toys, food, and detergents.  "GoodGuide is taking a break.  The GoodGuide site will be offline beginning June 1, 2020."  This is the message displayed when clicking on any link to GoodGuide.

Through its website, online toolbar and smartphone application, GoodGuide provided tools for consumers to make purchasing decisions on the basis of the health, environmental and social impact of a product’s life cycle. These products are designed to provide consumers with this information right at the point of sale, to help them to apply their values to their purchases.  The GoodGuide smartphone app read the bar codes on product labels using the phone's camera, and provides a summary of the product's score according to GoodGuide's rating system.

History
GoodGuide was created by University of California-Berkeley professor Dara O'Rourke, originally under the name Tao-It.

As an internet startup, GoodGuide raised $3.73 million in its first round of funding reported January, 2009 and $5.5 million in its second round reported June, 2009 from venture capitalists. As of May 31, 2010, according to Alexa Internet the website ranked about 50,000 worldwide, but about 20,000 in the United States.

In December 2009 testing of Zhu Zhu Pets done by GoodGuide reported more than the allowed level of the toxic metal antimony in the toy Mr. Squiggles. After doing a review, regulators from the U.S. Consumer Product Safety Commission said that the toy was within the "very protective" Federal mandatory standard. GoodGuide subsequently was forced to issue an apology saying their testing methods were different from the federal standards.

Ratings
For each listed product the site generates three ratings: a health rating, an environmental ratings, and a social rating. GoodGuide databases include the energy and resource consumed plus the pollution produced in manufacturing the product, the nutritional value of foods, the agricultural and animal husbandry practices, and the corporate sponsorship of social and political philanthropy.

Reviews and awards
GoodGuide was a final jury selection for TechCrunch50 in September 2008.

See also
 List of websites about food and drink
 Ethical consumerism
 Ecolabel
 Sustainable seafood advisory lists and certification
 Seafood Watch
 Green brands
 Fair trade

Notes

External links
This is the historic site but is defunct since at least 2020 (as of 2/2022)
GoodGuide.Com 

Android (operating system) software
Consumer guides
IOS software
Online companies of the United States
American review websites